Maximillion may refer to:

People
 Maximillion Cooper, founder of the Gumball 3000 business
 Max Thieriot (Maximillion Drake Thieriot, born 1988), American actor and director

Fictional characters
 Maximillion Pegasus, in the Yu-Gi-Oh! anime and manga series
 Maximillion Galactica, in video game Phoenix Wright: Ace Attorney − Justice for All

See also
 Maximilian, a name
 Max-A-Million, music group